Keri Smith is a Canadian author, illustrator and conceptual artist. 

Her work includes topics such as imperfection and impermanence from a visual arts perspective. Smith is also a freelance illustrator. Since fall 2010, she teaches part-time at Emily Carr University of Art and Design in Vancouver, British Columbia, Canada. In 2013 she became "Resident Thinker" for the piece Nowhereisland by artist Alex Hartley in the London 2012 Cultural Olympiad.

Smith's book Wreck This Journal encourages readers to expand their scopes of creativity. She is also credited with This Is Not a Book (2009,	Penguin Group) a mostly blank book intended to prompt creative responses from purchasers.

References

Canadian non-fiction writers
Canadian bloggers
Canadian women non-fiction writers
Living people
Guerilla artists
Canadian women bloggers
Year of birth missing (living people)